The Argentina men's national under-21 volleyball team represents Argentina in men's under-21 volleyball events, it is controlled and managed by the Argentinian Volleyball federation that is a member of South American volleyball body Confederación Sudamericana de Voleibol (CSV) and the international volleyball body government the Fédération Internationale de Volleyball (FIVB).

Results

FIVB U21 World Championship
 Champions   Runners up   Third place   Fourth place

South America U21 Championship

 Champions   Runners up   Third place   Fourth place

Pan-American U21 Cup

 Champions   Runners up   Third place   Fourth place

Team

Current squad

The following is the Argentine roster in the 2017 FIVB Volleyball Men's U21 World Championship.

Head coach: Alejandro Grossi

Notable players

References

External links
www.feva.org.ar 

Volleyball
National men's under-21 volleyball teams
Volleyball in Argentina